Peace Never Comes (Spanish:La paz empieza nunca) is a 1960 Spanish drama film directed by León Klimovsky and starring Adolfo Marsillach, Concha Velasco and Carmen de Lirio. It is set in the years following the Spanish Civil War. A man uses his relationship with a former lover to infiltrate a group of Republican insurgents against Francoist Spain.

Partial cast
 Adolfo Marsillach as Juan López, a Falangist.
 Concha Velasco as Paula 
 Carmen de Lirio as Pura  
 Carlos Casaravilla as Dóriga  
 Kanda Jaque as Carmina  
 Antonio Casas as Pedro  
 Jesús Puente as Mencia  
 Mario Berriatúa as Jorge  
 José Manuel Martín 
 Arturo López 
 Mara Laso as Concha

References

Bibliography 
 Bentley, Bernard. A Companion to Spanish Cinema. Boydell & Brewer 2008.

External links 
 

1961 drama films
Spanish drama films
1961 films
1960s Spanish-language films
Films directed by León Klimovsky
Films about the Spanish Maquis
1960s Spanish films